A List of highways numbered 489:

Japan
 Japan National Route 489, a route which connects Shunan to Yamaguchi

United States
 Nevada State Route 489 (LA 981),  a state highway that connected the near ghost town of Cherry Creek to U.S. Route 93 in White Pine County, Nevada 
 Maryland Route 489, a state highway in the U.S. state of Maryland 
 Secondary Highway 489, a road near the Yellowstone River, Montana
 Puerto Rico Highway 489, a highway in Hatillo municipality in Puerto Rico